Andrei Yuryevich Okounkov (Andrej Okun'kov) (born July 26, 1969) is a Russian mathematician who works on representation theory and its applications to algebraic geometry, mathematical physics, probability theory and special functions. He is currently a professor at the University of California, Berkeley and the academic supervisor of HSE International Laboratory of Representation Theory and Mathematical Physics. In 2006, he received the Fields Medal "for his contributions to bridging probability, representation theory and algebraic geometry."

Education and career 
He graduated with a B.S. in mathematics, summa cum laude, from Moscow State University in 1993 and received his doctorate, also at Moscow State, in 1995 under Alexandre Kirillov and Grigori Olshanski. He was a professor at Columbia University between 2010 and 2022. He previously was a professor at Princeton University, where he was awarded a Packard Fellowship (2001), the European Mathematical Society Prize (2004), and the Fields Medal (2006); an assistant and associate professor at Berkeley, where he was awarded a Sloan Research Fellowship; and an instructor at the University of Chicago. He rejoined the faculty at Berkeley in the summer of 2022.

Work 

He has worked on the representation theory of infinite symmetric groups, the statistics of plane partitions, and the quantum cohomology of the Hilbert scheme of points in the complex plane. Much of his work on Hilbert schemes was joint with Rahul Pandharipande.

Okounkov, along with Pandharipande, Nikita Nekrasov, and Davesh Maulik, has formulated well-known conjectures relating the Gromov–Witten invariants and Donaldson–Thomas invariants of threefolds.

In 2006, at the 25th International Congress of Mathematicians in Madrid, Spain, he received the Fields Medal "for his contributions to bridging probability, representation theory and algebraic geometry."
In 2016 he became a fellow of the American Academy of Arts and Sciences.

See also
Newton–Okounkov body

References

External links 
 Andrei Okounkov home page at Columbia
 Andrei Okounkov home page at Princeton
 

 EMS Prize 2004 citation
 Fields Medal citation 
 Andrei Okounkov's articles on the Arxiv
 Daily Princetonian story
 BBC story

21st-century Russian mathematicians
Fields Medalists
Moscow State University alumni
Princeton University faculty
Institute for Advanced Study visiting scholars
Columbia University faculty
University of California, Berkeley faculty
University of Chicago faculty
1969 births
Living people
Mathematicians from Moscow
Fellows of the American Academy of Arts and Sciences
Members of the United States National Academy of Sciences
Simons Investigator